Journal of the European Mathematical Society is a monthly peer-reviewed mathematical journal.
Founded in 1999, the journal publishes articles on all areas of pure and applied mathematics.

Most published articles are original research articles but the journal also publishes survey articles. The journal has been published by Springer until 2003. Since 2004, it is published by the European Mathematical Society. The first editor-in-chief was Jürgen Jost, followed in 2004 by Haïm Brezis.

The journal was founded in order to promote interdisciplinary work within the mathematical community  and to preserve unity across pure and applied mathematics.

Abstracting and indexing
The journal is abstracted in:
 Mathematical Reviews 
 Current Mathematical Publications 
 MathSciNet 
 Zentralblatt für Mathematik 
 Zentralblatt MATH 
 Science Citation Index Expanded 
 CompuMath Citation Index 
 Current Contents / Physical, Chemical & Earth Sciences 
 ISI Alerting Services 
 Journal Citation Reports/Science Edition

See also

 List of the journals published by the European Mathematical Society

References

External links
 
 EMS Press, the publishing house of the European Mathematical Society

Mathematics journals
Publications established in 1999
English-language journals
European Mathematical Society academic journals
Monthly journals